Te Tiarama is a French Polynesian political party formed by former President of French Polynesia Alexandre Léontieff in January 1988. Léontieff created the new party on January 23, 1988 following his departure from Tahoera'a Huiraatira and a rift with Gaston Flosse.

See also 
 List of political parties in French Polynesia
 Elections in French Polynesia
 Assembly of French Polynesia
 Politics of French Polynesia

References

Political parties in French Polynesia